The  were Christian missionaries and followers who were persecuted and executed for their faith in Japan, mostly during the Tokugawa shogunate period in the 17th century.

Background 

Christian missionaries arrived with Francis Xavier and the Jesuits in the 1540s and briefly flourished, with over 100,000 converts, including many daimyōs in Kyushu. The shogunate and imperial government at first supported the Catholic mission and the missionaries, thinking that they would reduce the power of the Buddhist monks, and help trade with Spain and Portugal. However, the Shogunate was also wary of colonialism, seeing that the Spanish had taken power in the Philippines, after converting the population. It soon met resistance from the highest office holders of Japan. Emperor Ogimachi issued edicts to ban Catholicism in 1565 and 1568, but to little effect. Beginning in 1587 with imperial regent Toyotomi Hideyoshi’s ban on Jesuit missionaries, Christianity was repressed as a threat to national unity. Many Christians were executed by burning at the stake in Nagasaki. After the Tokugawa shogunate banned Christianity in 1620, it ceased to exist publicly. Many Catholics went underground, becoming , while others lost their lives. Only after the Meiji Restoration, was Christianity re-established in Japan.

The first group of martyrs, known as the Twenty-Six Martyrs of Japan (1597), were canonized by the Church in 1862 by Pope Pius IX.

Martyrdom

The persecution of Missionaries and Christian followers continued after the martyrdom of the twenty-six souls in 1597. Jesuit fathers and others who had successfully fled to the Philippines wrote reports which led to a pamphlet that was printed in Madrid in 1624 "A Short Account of the Great and Rigorous Martyrdom, which last year (1622) was suffered in Japan by One Hundred and Eighteen Martyrs'.

Through the promulgation of decree on martyrdom, Pope Pius IX venerated these martyrs on 26 February 1866 and beatified them on 26 May 1867. This group is also known as Alfonso Navarrette Benito, Perdo of Ávila, Carlo Spinola, Ioachim Díaz Hirayama, Lucia de Freitas, and 200 companions.

Ordained Martyrs

Augustinian

Foreign Missionaries 
 Blessed Ferdinand Ayala Ferdinand of Saint Joseph – 1 June 1617
 Blessed Peter Zúñiga – 19 August 1622
 Blessed Bartolomé Gutiérrez Rodríguez – 3 September 1632
 Blessed Francis of Jesus – 3 September 1632
 Blessed Vincent of Saint Antony – 3 September 1632

Dominican

Foreign Missionaries 
 Blessed Alonso de Mena Navarette – 10 September 1622
 Blessed Alfonso Navarrete-Benito – 1 June 1617
 Blessed Angelo of Saint Vincent Ferrer Orsucci – 10 September 1622
 Blessed Domingo Castellet Vinale – 8 September 1628
 Blessed Francisco Morales Sedeño – 10 September 1622
 Blessed Jacinto Orfanell-Prades – 10 September 1622
 Blessed Jose of Saint Hyacinth Maroto – 10 September 1622
 Blessed Juan Martínez Cid – 19 March 1619
 Blessed Luis Bertrán Exarch – 29 July 1627
 Blessed Luis Flores (Louis Fraryn) – 19 August 1622
 Blessed Pedro of Saint Catherine Vásquez – 25 August 1624
 Blessed Tomás of the Holy Spirit – 12 September 1622

Japanese 
 Blessed Antonio of Saint Dominic - 8 September 1628
 Blessed Dominicus of the Rosary Magoshichirō – 10 September 1622
 Blessed Mancius of the Cross – 29 July 1627
 Blessed Mancius of Saint Thomas Shibata – 12 September 1622
 Blessed Petrus of Saint Mary – 29 July 1627
 Blessed Thomas of the Rosary – 10 September 1622
 Blessed Thomas of Saint Hyacinth – 8 September 1628

Franciscan – Alcantarines

Foreign Missionaries 
 Blessed Antonius of Saint Francis – 16 August 1627
 Blessed Francisco Gálvez Iranzo – 4 December 1623
 Blessed Francisco of Saint Mary – 16 August 1627
 Blessed Gabriel of the Magdalene – 3 September 1632
 Blessed Pedro of the Assumption – 22 May 1917
 Blessed Pedro of Ávila – 10 September 1622
 Blessed Vincent of Saint Joseph Ramírez – 10 September 1622

Japanese 
 Blessed Antonio of Saint Dominic – 8 September 1628
 Blessed Dominicus of Saint Francis – 8 September 1628
 Blessed Franciscus of Saint Bonaventure – 12 September 1622
 Blessed Paulus of Saint Clare – 12 September 1622

Franciscan – Observant

Foreign Missionaries 
 Blessed Apolinar Franco Garcia – 12 September 1622
 Blessed Bartolomé Días Laurel – 16 August 1627
 Blessed Juan Santamarta – 16 August 1618
 Blessed Luis Cabrera Sotelo – 25 August 1624
 Blessed Richard of Saint Anne – 10 September 1622

Japanese 
 Blessed Louis Sasada – 25 August 1624

Jesuit

Foreign Missionaries 
 Blessed Ambrosio Fernandes – 7 January 1620
 Blessed Baltasar de Torres Arias – 20 June 1626
 Blessed Camillo Battista Constanzo – 15 September 1622
 Blessed Carlo Spinola – 10 September 1622
 Blessed Diogo Carvalho (martyr) (Didacus Carvalho) – 22 February 1624
 Blessed Francisco Pacheco SJ – 20 June 1626
 Blessed John Baptist Zola – 20 June 1626
 Blessed Girolamo de Angelis – 4 December 1623
 Blessed João Baptista Machado de Távora – 22 May 1617
 Blessed Miguel de Carvalho – 25 August 1624 
 Blessed Pietro Paolo Navarra – 1 November 1622

Japanese 
 Blessed Antonius Ishida Kyūtaku – 3 September 1632  
 Blessed Antonius Kyūni – 10 September 1622
 Blessed Augustinus Ōta – 10 August 1622
 Blessed Dionisius Fujishima Jubyōe – 1 November 1622
 Blessed Gaspar Sadamatsu – 20 June 1626
 Blessed Gundisalvus Fusai Chōzō – 10 September 1622
 Blessed Ioannes Chūgoku – 10 September 1622
 Blessed Joannes Kisaku – 20 June 1626
 Blessed Leonardus Kimura – 18 November 1619
 Blessed Ludovicus Kawara Rokuemon – 10 September 1622
 Blessed Michaël Nakashima Saburōemon – 25 December 1628
 Blessed Michaël Satō Shunpō – 10 September 1622
 Blessed Michaël Tōzō – 20 June 1626
 Blessed Paulus Shinsuke – 20 June 1626
 Blessed Petrus Onizuka Sadayū – 1 November 1622
 Blessed Petrus Rinsei – 20 June 1626
 Blessed Petrus Sanpō – 10 September 1622
 Blessed Sebastianus Kimura – 10 September 1622
 Blessed Simon Enpō – 4 December 1623
 Blessed Thomas Akahoshi – 10 September 1622
 Blessed Thomas Tsūji – 7 September 1627
 Blessed Vincentius Kaǔn – 20 June 1626

Martyred Laity

Augustinian Laity

Japanese Religious Brother 
 Blessed John Shozaburo – 28 October 1630

Japanese Oblates 
 Blessed Michael Kiuchi Tayemon – 28 October 1630
 Blessed Peter Kuhieye – 28 October 1630
 Blessed Thomas Terai Kahioye – 28 October 1630

Japanese Tertiaries 
 Blessed Lawrence Hachizo – 28 October 1630
 Blessed Mancio Seisayemon – 28 October 1630

Dominican Laity

Foreign Missionaries – Confraternity of the Holy Rosary 
 Blessed Domingos Jorge – 18 November 1619

Japanese – Confraternity of the Holy Rosary 
 Blessed Agnes Takeya – 10 September 1622
 Blessed Alexius Nakamura – 27 November 1619
 Blessed Andreas Murayama Tokuan – 18 November 1619
 Blessed Andreas Yoshida – 1 October 1617
 Blessed Antonius Hamanomachi (Korean) – 10 September 1622
 Blessed Antonius Kimura – 27 November 1619
 Blessed Antonius Sanga – 10 September 1622
 Blessed Antonius Yamada – 19 August 1622
 Blessed Apollonia of Nagasaki – 10 September 1622
 Blessed Bartholomaeus Kawano Shichiemon – 10 September 1622
 Blessed Bartholomaeus Mohyōe – 19 August 1622
 Blessed Bartholomaeus Seki – 27 November 1619
 Blessed Catharina of Nagasaki – 10 September 1622
 Blessed Clara Yamada – 10 September 1622
 Blessed Clemens Ono – 10 September 1622
 Blessed Cosmas Takeya Sozaburō – 18 November 1619
 Blessed Damianus Tanda Yaichi – 10 September 1622
 Blessed Dominicus Nakano – 10 September 1622
 Blessed Dominicus Yamada – 10 September 1622
 Blessed Dominica Ogata – 10 September 1622
 Blessed Gaspar Ueda Hikojirō – 1 October 1617
 Blessed Iacobus Matsuo Denji – 19 August 1622
 Blessed Joannes Iwanaga – 27 November 1619
 Blessed Ioannes Miyazaki Soemon – 19 August 1622
 Blessed Joannes Motoyama – 27 November 1619
 Blessed Ioannes Nagata Matashichi – 19 August 1622
 Blessed Ioannes Yagō – 19 August 1622
 Blessed Joannes Yoshida Shōun – 18 November 1619
 Blessed Ioachim Diaz Hirayama – 19 August 1622
 Blessed Isabella Fernandes – 10 September 1622
 Blessed Jakub Bunzō Gengorō – 17 August 1620
 Blessed Laurentius Ikegami Rokusuke – 19 August 1622
 Blessed Leo Nakanishi – 27 November 1619
 Blessed Leo Sukeemon – 19 August 1622
 Blessed Matthias Kozasa – 27 November 1619
 Blessed Matthias Nakano – 27 November 1619
 Blessed Magdalena Kiyota Bokusai – 17 August 1620
 Blessed Magdalena Sanga – 10 September 1622
 Blessed Marcus Takenoshita Shin’emon – 19 August 1622
 Blessed Maria Gengorō – 17 August 1620
 Blessed Maria Hamanomachi – 10 September 1622
 Blessed Maria Murayama – 10 September 1622
 Blessed Maria Tanaura – 10 September 1622
 Blessed Maria Yoshida – 10 September 1622
 Blessed Michaël Diaz Hori – 19 August 1622
 Blessed Michaël Takeshita – 27 November 1619
 Blessed Paulus Sankichi – 19 August 1622
 Blessed Romanus Motoyama Myotarō – 27 November 1619
 Blessed Rufus Ishimoto – 10 September 1622
 Blessed Simon Kiyota Bokusai – 17 August 1620
 Blessed Thecla Nagaishi – 10 September 1622
 Blessed Thomas Gengorō – 17 August 1620
 Blessed Thomas Koteda Kyūmi – 27 November 1619
 Blessed Thomas Koyanagi – 19 August 1622
 Blessed Thomas Shichirō – 10 September 1622

Japanese Tertiaries 
 Blessed Alexius Sanbashi Saburō – 10 September 1622
 Blessed Caius Akashi Jiemon – 16 August 1627
 Blessed Dominicus Shobyōye – 16 September 1628
 Blessed Francisca Pinzokere – 16 August 1627
 Blessed Gaspar Koteda – 11 September 1622
 Blessed Iacobus Hayashida – 10 September 1628
 Blessed Ioannes Imamura – 8 September 1628
 Blessed Joannes Tomachi – 8 September 1628
 Blessed Leo Aibara – 8 September 1628
 Blessed Leo Kurōbyōe Nakamura – 16 August 1627
 Blessed Lucia Ludovica – 8 September 1628
 Blessed Ludovicus Nihachi – 8 September 1628
 Blessed Magdalena Kiyota – 16 August 1627
 Blessed Maria Tanaka – 10 September 1622
 Blessed Matthaeus Alvarez Anjin – 8 September 1628
 Blessed Michaël Himonoya – 16 September 1628
 Blessed Michaël Yamada Kasahashi – 8 September 1628
 Blessed Paulus Aibara Sandayū – 8 September 1628
 Blessed Paulus Himonoya – 16 September 1628
 Blessed Paulus Nagaishi – 10 September 1622
 Blessed Paulus Tanaka – 10 September 1622
 Blessed Romanus Aibara – 8 September 1628

Franciscan Laity

Japanese Tertiaries 
 Blessed Franciscus Kuhyōe – 16 August 1627
 Blessed Gaspar Vaz – 16 August 1627  Tsuji Shōbyōe
 Blessed Hieronymus of the Cross – 3 September 1632  Iyo
 Blessed Leo Satsuma – 10 September 1622
 Blessed Louis Baba – 25 August 1624
 Blessed Ludovicus Maki Soetsu – 7 September 1627
 Blessed Ludovicus Matsuo Soyemon – 16 August 1627
 Blessed Lucia de Freitas – 10 September 1622
 Blessed Lucas Tsuji Kyūemon – 16 August 1627
 Blessed Martinus Gómez Tōzaemon – 1 August 1627
 Blessed Maria Vaz – 16 August 1627  Maria Shōbyōe
 Blessed Michaël Koga Kizayemon – 16 August 1627
 Blessed Thomas Satō Shin’emon (Korean) – 16 August 1627

Catechist Laity

Japanese 
 Blessed Caius of Korea (Korean) – 15 November 1624
 Blessed Leo Tanaka (martyr) – 1 June 1617
 Blessed Matthias of Nagasaki – 27 May 1620

Christian Laity

Japanese 
 Blessed Andreas Yakichi – 2 October 1622
 Blessed Antonius Ono – 10 September 1622
 Blessed Catharina Tanaka – 12 July 1626
 Blessed Clemens Kyūemon – 1 November 1622
 Blessed Dominicus Magoshichi – 12 September 1622
 Blessed Dominicus Nihachi – 8 September 1628
 Blessed Dominicus Tomachi – 8 September 1628
 Blessed Franciscus Nihachi – 8 September 1628
 Blessed Franciscus Takeya – 11 September 1622
 Blessed Franciscus Yakichi – 2 October 1622
 Blessed Ignatius Jorge-Fernandes – 10 September 1622
 Blessed Ioannes Hamanomachi – 10 September 1622
 Blessed Ioannes Maki Jizaemon – 7 September 1627
 Blessed Ioannes Onizuka Naizen – 12 July 1626
 Blessed Ioannes Tanaka – 12 July 1626
 Blessed Laurentius Yamada – 8 September 1628
 Blessed Lucia Yakichi – 2 October 1622
 Blessed Ludovicus Onizuka – 12 July 1626
 Blessed Ludovicus Yakichi – 2 October 1622
 Blessed Mancius Araki Kyūzaburō – 8 July 1626
 Blessed Matthias Araki Hyōzaemon – 12 July 1626
 Blessed Michaël Tanda – 10 September 1622
 Blessed Michaël Tomachi – 8 September 1628
 Blessed Monica Onizuka – 12 July 1626
 Blessed Paulus Tomachi – 8 September 1628
 Blessed Petrus Araki Chobyōe – 12 July 1626
 Blessed Petrus Hamanomachi – 10 September 1622
 Blessed Petrus Kawano – 11 September 1622
 Blessed Petrus Nagaishi – 10 September 1622
 Blessed Thomas Tomachi – 8 September 1628
 Blessed Zuzanna Araki Chobyōe – 12 July 1626

See also 
 Christianity in Japan
 Kirishitan
 Martyrs of Japan
 Nanban trade
 Paulo Miki
 Roman Catholicism in Japan
 Twenty-Six Martyrs Museum and Monument

Notes

External links
The 26 Martyrs Museum in Nagasaki City, Japan
Catholic Bishops Conference of Japan: Timeline of the Catholic Church in Japan
Daughters of St. Paul Convent, Tokyo, Japan: Prohibition of Christian religion by Hideyoshi and the 26 martyrs
 
The Japanese Martyrs
Nagasaki Wiki: Detailed Access Information from Nagasaki Station to 26 Martyrs Monument
2008 Beatification of Japanese Martyrs
 Kirish'tan:  Heaven's Samurai,  a historical novel that includes the story of the Twenty-six Martyrs
Britto, Francis. All About Francis Xavier

Catholic martyrs of the Early Modern era
Roman Catholic child blesseds
Martyrs
Executed children
17th century in Japan
Japanese beatified people
Martyred groups
Persecution by Buddhists
People executed by Japan
Martyrs
Groups of Roman Catholic saints
 Martyrs
Lists of Christian martyrs
Lists of saints
Beatifications by Pope Pius IX